Harold Henry Barker (15 June 1889, in Elbow Lake, Minnesota – 23 March 1949) was a Minnesota Farmer-Laborite politician, candidate for Governor of Minnesota, and a Speaker of the Minnesota House of Representatives. He was elected to the Minnesota House of Representatives, in 1930, where he caucused with the Liberal Caucus in the then-nonpartisan body. In 1937, he was elected to serve as speaker, a position he held for two years. His father, H. W. Barker, served in the Wisconsin State Senate.

In 1946, Barker served as the second gubernatorial candidate after of the merger of the Minnesota Democratic and Farmer-Labor Parties into the Democratic-Farmer-Labor Party, losing to Luther Youngdahl.

References

1889 births
1949 deaths
Speakers of the Minnesota House of Representatives
Democratic Party members of the Minnesota House of Representatives
20th-century American politicians
People from Elbow Lake, Minnesota